Preshil School, also known as The Margaret Lyttle Memorial School, is an independent progressive co-educational, day school located in Kew, an eastern suburb of Melbourne, Victoria, Australia. The original Arlington campus houses the Kindergarten and Primary school, while the Secondary School is located at the Blackhall Kalimna campus. The campuses are located on Barkers Road and Sackville Street respectively.

Established in 1931 by Greta Lyttle (and later, Margaret E. Lyttle), Preshil teaches a progressive curriculum, and is Australia's oldest progressive school. The school caters for students from Kindergarten through to Year 12. In 2017 the school phased out the Victorian Certificate of Education in favour of the International Baccalaureate programme.

Principals

Notable alumni

 Polly Borland – artist
 Clare BowditchARIA Award-winning artist
 Lauren Burnsgold medallist in taekwondo at the Sydney 2000 Olympic Games
 Zahava Elenbergarchitect
 Nicolette Fraillonchief conductor of The Australian Ballet Orchestra
 Todd Goldstein – Australian rules footballer playing for the North Melbourne Football Club
 Lisa Gortonnovelist, poet, granddaughter of Prime Minister John Gorton
 Kaiya Jones – actor on Neighbours
 Catherine Anne Money (née Menzies) – scientist at CSIRO (attended primary School)
 Brendan MurphyChief Medical Officer of Australia
 Sue Richardson – economist and academic
 Sweeney Reed - Artist
 Gina Riley – actor known for playing Kim Craig on Kath and Kim
 Jane Routley - fantasy author
 Peter Singerphilosopher
 Charlie Thorpe (musician) – singer in Dash and Will
 Stephen Housden - Musician, lead guitarist for Little River Band
 Greg Hjorth - Australian Professor of Mathematics, chess International Master (1984) and Commonwealth Champion in 1983.

Arlington Campus (395 Barkers Road, Kew) 
In 1937, growing numbers lead to the relocation of the primary school to its present site, Arlington campus, further along Barkers’ Road. Greta and Margaret continued to live at the school.

Blackhall-Kalimna Campus (12-26 Sackville Street, Kew)
Blackhall was built in 1890 as a private home for William Henry Roberts. In May 1915, ‘Blackhall’ was purchased for £1800 by the Salvation Army and renamed the ‘Catherine Booth Girls’ Home’. The home provided accommodation from 1915 to 1976 for about 90 to 100 girls between the ages of 4 and 16. An original plaque can still be seen at the front entrance. Catherine Booth and her husband William were the founders of the Salvation Army. In November 1955, Catherine Booth Girls' Home was declared an approved children's home under the Children's Welfare Act 1954. During the mid 1950s attempts were made to convert the large scale dormitories to smaller unit accommodation. In the 1960s, the Home began accepting boys aged 2 to 8 years, to keep siblings together. By 1969, its capacity had reduced to 48 with an increasing emphasis on small group care for girls in the 4 to 16 year old age group. In 1972, children were transferred to the home when the Salvation Army closed the William Booth Girls' Home in East Camberwell. The Catherine Booth Girls' Home closed in 1976. Preshil purchased Blackhall for its Senior School in 1978.
In 1890 William H. Jarman, accountant, was the first owner and occupier of 'Kalimna', a substantial two-storey residence; it having an initial N.A.V. of £1503. In the following year the N.A.V. for the eleven-roomed property had increased to £2504 indicating that the building had been completed. Jarman is recorded as owning and occupying 'Kalimna' until at least 1910. Kalimna from 1945 became known as Myra House and was established by the Catholic Church and run 'voluntarily' by the Legion of Mary. It was a Home for girls aged 14 to 18. It could accommodate up to 12 residents, and the average stay was between 3 and 5 months. Myra House was located in Kew until 1954 when it moved to the suburb of Malvern. It closed around 1970. The opening of Myra House, run by the Legion of Mary, was announced in January 1945. Catholic Archbishop of Melbourne, Daniel Mannix, stated that girls trained by the Legion of Mary at Myra House "would be able to face the world with every confidence".

Yallambie
In 1975 Preshil purchased former Chief Justice of Australia, Sir Owen Dixon's home in Kew 'Yallambie' after he died. The interior was gutted to construct classrooms. The school later sold the campus.

Burke and Wills
During the 1980s David Corke and students and teachers from Preshil identified a number of blazes marking Burke's camps from the Cooper to the Diamantina. Corke also replotted the site of Wills' death and an additional memorial cairn was erected by Joe Mack at the revised location.

ERA Secondary School
ERA Secondary School in Donvale was founded by Preshil Parents who wanted a secondary school to complete education after Preshil. Although Preshil later withdrew support in 1970 the school officially opened in 1971 at 'The White House' in Warrandyte int a temporary premises and later that year in Donvale. The school closed in 1987 due to financial struggles.

See also

List of schools in Victoria, Australia

References

Bibliography

External links

 
 

Private schools in Melbourne
Alternative schools
Educational institutions established in 1931
1931 establishments in Australia
International Baccalaureate schools in Australia
Buildings and structures in the City of Boroondara